King David is an oil on canvas painting by Matthias Stom, created c. 1633-1639, now held in the Musee des Beaux-Arts de Marseille. It is thought to have belonged to a set of four paintings of Old Testament kings. This group was itself part of a larger group of twelve works which also included the four Fathers of the Church (St Ambrose, St Gregory, St Jerome and St Augustine of Hippo) and the four Evangelists (St John, St Luke, St Mark and St Matthew), of which St Mark, St John and St Ambrose are now in the Musee des Beaux-Arts de Rennes.

References

1639 paintings
Paintings in Provence-Alpes-Côte d'Azur
Paintings by Matthias Stom
Paintings depicting David